Sailing Hawks is a rock climbing area near Durango, Colorado considered to be one of the area's best bouldering locations.  This area is also used for hiking, riding, and other recreational uses.

External links
 Overview map & routes
 Mountain Project

References

Protected areas of La Plata County, Colorado
Climbing areas of Colorado
Durango, Colorado